Erzsébet Nagy (born 27 March 1946) is a Hungarian rower. She competed at the 1976 Summer Olympics and the 1980 Summer Olympics.

References

1946 births
Living people
Hungarian female rowers
Olympic rowers of Hungary
Rowers at the 1976 Summer Olympics
Rowers at the 1980 Summer Olympics
Rowers from Budapest